Alfons Karpiński (February 20, 1875 – June 6, 1961) was a Polish painter specializing in portraits of women, still-lives and landscapes. His work is associated with the traditionalist and decorative trends in Polish 20th-century painting.

Life and work 
He continued his studies at the Academy of Fine Arts Vienna under Kazimierz Pochwalski and finally, at the Parisian Académie Colarossi. 

At the turn of the century he became a contributing artist to the Zielony Balonik art-and-literary cabaret in Kraków. He was a member of the Society of Polish Artists "Sztuka" (Art). Karpiński remained active following the end of World War II and died in 1961 in Kraków.

See also
 List of Polish painters

References

External links 
 Alfons Karpinski's gallery at malarze.com
 Virtual Art Nouveau museum—Alfons Karpinski

1875 births
1961 deaths
19th-century Polish painters
19th-century Polish male artists
20th-century Polish painters
20th-century Polish male artists
Polish portrait painters
Académie Colarossi alumni
Polish male painters
People from Stalowa Wola